A series of protests against the Nigerian Naira and the 2023 Nigerian presidential election began on February 4 due to the Nigerian Naira, protests due to the election are still occurring as of today.

References

February 2023 events in Africa
2023 in Nigeria
2023 protests
2023 Nigerian presidential election